Charade or charades may refer to:

Games
 Charades, originally "acting charades", a parlor game

Films/TV 
 Charade (1953 film), an American film featuring James Mason
 Charade (1963 film), an American film starring Cary Grant and Audrey Hepburn
 Charade (1984 film), a Canadian animated short film by John Minnis
 Charades (film), 1998, starring Erika Eleniak
 "Charade" (Revenge), a television episode
 "The Charade" 2010 TV episode of Romantically Challenged
 "Charades" (Scorpion), a 2014 episode of the action drama series Scorpion

Music

Groups
 Charade, a band renamed from Bonfire
The Charade, band who covered Carpet Man
The Charades, a doo-wop group

Albums
Charade (Charade album)
Charade (Alice album)

Songs
"Charade" (1963 song), the theme song composed by Henry Mancini for the 1963 film
"Charade" (Bee Gees song), a 1974 Bee Gees song
"The Charade" (Serj Tankian song), a 2010 Serj Tankian song
"Charades" (song), a 2014 Jennifer Lopez song
"The Charade" (D'Angelo song), a 2015 D'Angelo song

Other uses 
Charade (Soulcalibur), a character from the Soul series of fighting games
Charade Circuit, a French auto-racing track
Daihatsu Charade, an automobile